A chemical accident is the unintentional release of one or more chemical hazard substances which could harm human health and the environment.  Such events include fires, explosions, leakages or release of toxic or hazardous materials that can cause people illness, injury, or disability. Chemical accident can be caused by natural disaster, or accidental human error, or deliberate move to cause chaos and destructions for personal gain.

While chemical accidents may occur whenever toxic materials are stored, transported or used, the most severe  are industrial accidents, involving major chemical manufacturing and storage facilities.

Examples 

The most dangerous chemical accident recorded in history was the 1984 Bhopal gas tragedy in India, in which more than 3,000 people died after a highly toxic vapor, methyl isocyanate, was released at a Union Carbide Pesticides factory. The release happened after the storage tank safety valve had failed to contain the excess pressure created by the exothermic reaction between water and methyl isocyanate. The accident was caused by a faulty valve that let the water into the tank. The safety refrigeration unit for the tank also was not functional since it did not have any coolant. 

The 2020 Beirut explosion was one of the biggest non-nuclear explosions in history. It happened when approximately 2750 tons of ammonium nitrate inside a warehouse at the port exploded.

Safety improvements 
Efforts to prevent accidents range from improved safety systems to fundamental changes in chemical use and manufacture, referred to as primary prevention or inherent safety.

In the United States, concern about chemical accidents after the Bhopal disaster led to the passage of the 1986 Emergency Planning and Community Right-to-Know Act. The EPCRA requires local emergency planning efforts throughout the country, including emergency notifications. The law also requires companies to make publicly available information about their storage of toxic chemicals. Based on such information, citizens can identify the vulnerable zones in which severe toxic releases could cause harm or even in some cases death.

In 1990, the Chemical Safety and Hazard Investigation Board  (CSB) was established by the Congress, though it did not become operational until 1998. The Board's mission is to determine the root causes of chemical accidents and issue safety recommendations to prevent future chemical accidents. Note that the CSB does not issue fines or citations since the Congress designed the agency to be non-regulatory. It also organizes workshops on a number of issues related to preparing for, preventing, and responding to chemical accidents.

In the European Union, incidents such as the Flixborough disaster and the Seveso disaster led to legislation such as the Seveso Directive and Seveso planning and provide for 
safety reports to local authorities. Many countries have organizations that can assist with substance risk assessment and emergency planning that is required by a wide variety of legislation, such as the National Chemical Emergency Centre in the UK, Brandweerinformatiecentrum voor gevaarlijke stoffen/Fire Brigade Information Center for Hazardous Materials in Belgium.

See also
Chemical safety

Reference

External links
U.S. Chemical Safety Board
Occupational Safety and Health Administration
United States Coast Guard National Response Center
24-7 Response
National Chemical Emergency Centre
Brandweerinformatiecentrum voor gevaarlijke stoffen/Fire services information centre for dangerous goods
Case Studies in Process Plant Accidents
 U.S. EPA, Chemical Emergency Preparedness and Prevention Office 
 Safety in the use of Chemicals at work – International Labour Organization (ILO) – (PDF-file)
 MSDSonline.com A Searchable Database for Material Safety Data Sheets(MSDS)
OECD Programme on Chemical Accidents: Environment Directorate
Guiding Principles for Chemical Accident Prevention, Preparedness and Response
 National Institute for Occupational Safety and Health – Chemical Safety
 A searchable database for chemical safety accidents and lessons learned – FACTSOnline
Preventing Chemical Accidents – How to Prevent Chemicals From Contaminating Your Workplace – Safety Storage Systems

 
Accident
Occupational safety and health
Industrial fires and explosions